The 15th Texas Infantry Regiment was a unit of volunteers recruited in Texas that fought in the Confederate States Army during the American Civil War. The regiment organized in early 1862 and throughout the war served west of the Mississippi River in the Trans-Mississippi Department. In October 1863, the unit was assigned to a brigade led by the French aristocrat Prince Camille de Polignac. The 15th Texas Infantry fought at Stirling's Plantation and Bayou Bourbeux in 1863 and Mansfield, Pleasant Hill, and Yellow Bayou in 1864. The regiment disbanded in May 1865, though the formal surrender date was 26 May 1865.

References

Units and formations of the Confederate States Army from Texas
1862 establishments in Texas
Military units and formations established in 1862
1865 disestablishments in Texas
Military units and formations disestablished in 1865